Jimmy Jones  (born 1895) was a Welsh international footballer. He was part of the Wales national football team, making 3 appearances and being named in the starting line up on 18 April 1925 against Ireland. At club level, he played for Cardiff, Wrexham and Torquay United.

See also
 List of Wales international footballers (alphabetical)

References

1901 births
Place of birth missing

Date of death missing

Year of death missing
Welsh footballers

Wales international footballers
Wrexham A.F.C. players
Torquay United F.C. players
Wales amateur international footballers
Association footballers not categorized by position